The 2022 Down Senior Football Championship was the 114th official edition of Down GAA's premier Gaelic football tournament for senior clubs in County Down. 16 teams competed, with the winning team representing Down in the Ulster Senior Club Football Championship. The tournament operated a double elimination format for the opening two rounds of the championship, with the winners and early round losers rejoining at the quarter final stage.

Kilcoo came into the competition as defending Down, Ulster and All-Ireland champions.

Team changes

The following teams have changed division since the 2021 championship season.

To S.F.C.
Promoted from 2021 Down I.F.C.
 An Riocht (2021 Down Intermediate Football Champions)

From S.F.C.
Relegated to 2022 Down I.F.C.
 Rostrevor (Lost 2021 Relegation Play Off)

 –

Participating teams
The following teams take part in the 2022 edition of the Down Senior Football Championship.

 Ballyholland Harps (Round 3)
 Bryansford (Round 2B)
 Burren (quarter-final)
 Carryduff (quarter-final)
 Castlewellan (quarter-final)
 Clonduff (quarter-final)
 Kilcoo (champions) 
 Loughinisland (semi-final)
 Mayobridge (semi-final)
 RGU Downpatrick (Round 3)
 Warrenpoint (final)

 An Riocht (Round 2B)
 Bredagh (Round 2B)
 Glenn (Round 3)
 Longstone (Round 2B)
 Saul (Round 3)

 Bold denotes a team still active in the competition

Round 1
The 16 participating teams were placed into an open draw. The winning teams advance to Round 2A, while losing sides proceed to Round 2B.

Round 2

Round 2A
Round 2A will feature the eight winning teams from Round 1, with an open draw to determine the fixtures. The winning teams progress directly to the quarter-finals, with the losing teams proceeding to Round 3.

Round 2B
Round 2B sees the eight losing teams from Round 1 compete for a place in Round 3. The losing teams from this round will be eliminated from the competition.

Relegation Semi-finals
The 4 losers of Round 2B play each other in the Relegation Semi-finals. The 2 winners will secure their Senior status for 2023, while the 2 losers will face-off in the Relegation Final.

Relegation Final
The winner of the Relegation Final will maintain their Senior status into 2023, while the loser will be relegated to the 2023 Down I.F.C.

 An Riocht relegated to 2023 Down Intermediate Football Championship

Round 3
Round 3 is a supplementary round for teams to have a second chance at reaching the quarter-finals. This round features teams that have lost once so far in this year's competition, either winning in Round 1 and losing in Round 2A, or losing in Round 1 but winning their Round 2B fixture. The losing teams in this round are eliminated from this year's competition.

This round is seeded, meaning that in each fixture a Round 2A losing team will face a Round 2B winning team.

Quarter-finals
The quarter-finals see the two brackets rejoin, with the earlier Round 2A winners facing a Round 3 winner for a semi-final spot.

Semi-finals
The semi-finals will see the four winning sides face off for a place in this year's final. This round is an open draw from the four quarter-final winners.

Final
The final will be played between the two semi-final winning teams, and will take place at Páirc Esler, Newry.

See also
 2022 Down Intermediate Football Championship

References

External links
 Down GAA

Down SFC
Down Senior Football Championship
Down Senior Football Championship